Connecticut Route 207 is a state highway running from Hebron to Sprague.

Route description

Route 207 begins at an intersection with Route 85 in southeastern Hebron and heads east into Lebanon.  In Lebanon, it heads southeast between Williams and Brewster Ponds before turning east through the town center and into Franklin.  In Franklin, it continues east past Gages Pond before turning southeast in eastern Franklin and crossing into Sprague.  In Sprague, it continues east to end at an intersection with Route 97 on the west bank of the Shetucket River in Baltic.

The section of Route 207 in Franklin is designated the Paul Henry Bienvenue Memorial Highway.

History
In 1922, the road from Taftville via Baltic and North Franklin to Lebanon center, was designated as a secondary state highway known as Highway 354. The portion of old Highway 354 between Lebanon center and Baltic was renumbered to Route 207 in the 1932 state highway renumbering. At the same time, the section from Baltic to Taftville was assigned as part of Route 97. In 1935, Route 207 was extended west to the village of Exeter (at Route 16), and further westward to Hebron center (at Route 85) in 1940. At around the same time, the eastern end was reconfigured such that it paralleled but did not intersect Route 97 to the Sprague-Norwich town line. The eastern terminus was moved to its current location in 1962. In 1961, a section in Franklin was reconstructed and realigned to improve the grade.

Junction list

References

External links

207
Transportation in New London County, Connecticut
Transportation in Tolland County, Connecticut